The 2004 Alps Tour was the fourth season of the Alps Tour, one of four third-tier tours recognised by the European Tour.

Schedule
The following table lists official events during the 2004 season.

Order of Merit
The Order of Merit was based on prize money won during the season, calculated using a points-based system. The top four players on the tour (not otherwise exempt) earned status to play on the 2005 Challenge Tour.

Notes

References

Alps Tour